Teah Charlton (born 25 April 2002) is an Australian rules footballer playing for  in the AFL Women's (AFLW).

Early football
Charlton played local football for the Christies Beach Football Club, and represented South Australia at the School Sport Australia Australian Football championships, where she was named an All-Australian at age 15. After competing in surf lifesaving up until the age of 15, 2019 saw her begin to compete for the South Adelaide Football Club in the SANFLW. She quickly became one of the best young players, winning the Breakthrough Player Award after being nominated in Round 3 of that season for a 1-goal, 19 disposal performance against West Adelaide. She also finished in the Top 10 of the Goalkicking, lead the lead for tackles with a total of 77, and also played in the team's grand final victory in 2019, where she collected 18 disposals and 5 tackles. She averaged 15.8 disposals per game and kicked 8 goals through the home and away season, and 3 during the finals. 2020 saw her season cut short by the COVID-19 pandemic, playing just 4 games. She averaged 19.1 disposals and 5.3 tackles per game, finishing equal seventh in the league's best and fairest voting.

AFLW career
On debut, she collected 8 disposals, 1 behind, 2 marks and 7 tackles. She tallied a career high 14 disposals against Fremantle in Round 3, and kicked 2 goals against St Kilda, one of them receiving a Goal of the Year nomination.

Statistics
Statistics are correct to the end of the 2021 season.

|- style="background-color: #eaeaea"
! scope="row" style="text-align:center" | 2021
|style="text-align:center;"|
| 25 || 11 || 3 || 2 || 48 || 53 || 101 || 12 || 35 || 0.3 || 0.2 || 4.4 || 4.8 || 9.2 || 1.1 || 3.2 || 
|- 
|- class="sortbottom"
! colspan=3| Career
! 11
! 3
! 2
! 48
! 53
! 101
! 12
! 35
! 0.3
! 0.2
! 4.4
! 4.8
! 9.2
! 1.1
! 3.2
! 0
|}

Personal life
Charlton cited her favourite footballer as Rory Sloane.

References

External links

2002 births
Living people
Adelaide Football Club (AFLW) players
Australian rules footballers from South Australia
South Adelaide Football Club players (Women's)
Christies Beach Football Club players